Fitchia nutans is a species of flowering plant in the family Asteraceae. It is found only in French Polynesia.

References

nutans
Flora of French Polynesia
Taxonomy articles created by Polbot
Taxa named by Joseph Dalton Hooker